Dave Regan is a fictional character appearing in several well-known short stories written by popular Australian writer and poet Henry Lawson. 

A laid-back, somewhat mischievous young man, Dave is rarely found without the company of good mates Jim Bently and Andy Page. 

Arguably, Dave's character first appeared in Lawson's short story, "Andy Page's Rival", though his character is named as Dave Bentley (note that the character of Jim Bently does not appear in this story). Dave is described in this story as "an old chum and mate of Andy's who had always liked, admired, and trusted him." This story was published in Lawson's collection "On The Track" in 1900. 
"The Iron-Bark Chip," which includes the characters of Dave Regan, Jack Bentley (most likely the character more commonly known as Jim Bently) and Andy Page was published in the same collection. So, too, was "The Mystery of Dave Regan" which includes Dave and Jim. 

Possibly the most popular Dave Regan story would be Lawson's humorous The Loaded Dog, in which Dave's imaginative idea of fishing with explosives backfires when the cartridge is left unattended.

Dave Regan short stories
Andy Page's Rival (as Dave Bentley)
The Iron-Bark Chip
The Mystery of Dave Regan
Poisonous Jimmy Gets Left
The Loaded Dog

See also
 Jim Bently
 Andy Page

Australian short stories
Regan, Dave